The sack of Magdeburg, also called Magdeburg's Wedding or Magdeburg's Sacrifice, was the destruction of the Protestant city of Magdeburg on 20 May 1631 by the Imperial Army and the forces of the Catholic League, resulting in the deaths of around 20,000, including both defenders and non-combatants. The event is considered the worst massacre of the Thirty Years' War. Magdeburg, then one of the largest cities in Germany, having well over 25,000 inhabitants in 1630, did not recover its importance until well into the 18th century.

Background

Archbishopric of Magdeburg

The archbishopric of Magdeburg was established as an ecclesiastical principality in 968. In political respect the Erzstift, the archiepiscopal and capitular temporalities, had gained imperial immediacy as prince-archbishopric in 1180. This meant that the archbishop of Magdeburg ruled the town and the lands around it in all matters, worldly and spiritual.

Protestant Reformation

The citizens of Magdeburg had turned Protestant in 1524 and joined the Schmalkaldic League against the religious policies of the Catholic emperor Charles V in 1531. During the Schmalkaldic War of 1546/47, the Lower Saxon city became a refuge for Protestant scholars, which earned it the epithet ,  but also an Imperial ban that lasted until 1562. The citizens refused to acknowledge Emperor Charles's Augsburg Interim and were besieged by Imperial troops under Maurice, Elector of Saxony in 1550/51.

Protestant archbishops and Administrators
The Roman Catholic archdiocese had de facto turned void since 1557, when the last papally confirmed prince-archbishop, the Lutheran Sigismund of Brandenburg came of age and ascended to the see.

Openly Lutheran Christian William of Brandenburg, elected to be archbishop in 1598, was denied recognition by the imperial authorities. Since about 1600, he styled himself Administrator of Magdeburg, as did other Protestant German notables assigned to govern principalities that were de jure property of the Catholic church.

Alliance with the Danish king
During the Thirty Years' War, Administrator Christian William entered into an alliance with Denmark. In 1626, he led an army from Lower Saxony into the Battle of Dessau Bridge. After Wallenstein won this battle, Christian William fled abroad. In 1629, he fled to the court of King Gustavus Adolphus of Sweden.

As a result of these developments, in January 1628, the Magdeburg cathedral chapter deposed Christian William and elected Augustus of Wettin, 13-year-old son of John George I, Elector of Saxony, as Administrator. Augustus did not assume office immediately due to his father's unwillingness to provoke the emperor.

Edict of Restitution

In March 1629, Emperor Ferdinand II passed the Edict of Restitution. It was specifically aimed at restoring the situation of the 1555 Peace of Augsburg in ecclesiastical territories that had since strayed from "legal" Catholic faith and rule. Bremen and Magdeburg were the biggest examples of territories to be restituted.

Alliance with the Swedish king
The city's councillors had been emboldened by King Gustavus Adolphus's landing in Pomerania on 6 July 1630. The Swedish king was a Lutheran Christian, and many of Magdeburg's residents were convinced that he would aid them in their struggle against the Roman Catholic Habsburg emperor, Ferdinand II. However, not all Protestant princes of the Holy Roman Empire had immediately embraced Adolphus; some believed his chief motive for entering the war was to take northern German ports, which would allow him to control commerce in the Baltic Sea.

In November 1630, King Gustavus sent ex-Administrator Christian William back to Magdeburg, along with Dietrich von Falkenberg to direct the city's military affairs. Backed by the Lutheran clergy, Falkenberg had the suburbs fortified and additional troops recruited.

Magdeburg besieged
When the Magdeburg citizens refused to pay a tribute demanded by the emperor, Imperial forces under the command of a Flemish mercenary, Johann Tserclaes, Count of Tilly laid siege to the city within a matter of months. The city was besieged from 20 March 1631 and Tilly put his subordinate Imperial Field Marshal , a Catholic convert, in command while he campaigned elsewhere. During fierce fighting, Imperial troops numbering 24,000, roughly the same number as Magdeburg's entire population, conquered several sconces of the city's fortification and Tilly demanded capitulation.

Assault and sacking

The Magdeburg citizens had hoped in vain for a Swedish relief attack. On the last day of the siege, the councillors decided it was time to sue for peace, but word of their decision did not reach Tilly in time.

In the early morning of 20 May, the attack began with heavy artillery fire. Soon afterward, Pappenheim and Tilly launched infantry attacks. The fortifications were breached and Imperial forces were able to overpower the defenders to open the Kröcken Gate, which allowed the entire army to enter the city to plunder it. The defence of the city was further weakened and demoralised when commander Dietrich von Falkenberg was shot dead by Catholic Imperial troops.

Sacking and arson
There are written reports of the attackers setting fire to single houses to dislodge persistent defenders. That the fire then spread all over the city appears to have been unintended. By ten o'clock most of the city was on fire. General Tilly sent some soldiers to save the cathedral, where 1,000 survivors had fled. Most of the victims in the sack suffocated or burned to death. The wind fanned the flames, further spreading the fire, in the end destroying 1,700 of the city's 1,900 buildings.

Out of control
 
Whilst Magdeburg was razed by the fire, many Imperial soldiers supposedly went out of control. The invading soldiers had not received payment for their service and demanded valuables from every household they encountered. There were reports of rapes and torture.

Of the 25,000 inhabitants, only 5,000 survived, at least 1,000 of these having fled into Magdeburg Cathedral and 600 into the Premonstratensian monastery. Tilly finally ordered an end to the looting on 24 May, and a Catholic mass was celebrated at the cathedral on the next day. For another fourteen days, charred bodies were dumped in the Elbe River to prevent disease.

Aftermath
A census conducted in 1632 listed only 449 inhabitants. Much of the city remained rubble until at least 1720.

Reactions

After Magdeburg's capitulation to the Imperial forces, there were disputes between residents who had favoured resistance to the emperor and those who had opposed it. King Gustavus Adolphus joined the argument, claiming the citizens of Magdeburg had not been willing to pay the necessary funds for their defence.

Duke Maximilian of Bavaria, president of the Catholic League, concluded a congratulatory letter to Tilly on 1 June with the wish that "the enemies, powers and forces opposing Catholicism, the only religion offering salvation, would finally be ruined".

Pope Urban VIII wrote a congratulatory letter to Tilly on 18 June, saying: "You have washed your victorious hands in the blood of sinners."

The Imperial treatment of defeated Magdeburg helped persuade many Protestant rulers in the Holy Roman Empire to stand against the Roman Catholic emperor.

Notoriety
The devastations were so great that  (or "magdeburgization") became a common term signifying total destruction, rape and pillaging for decades. The terms "Magdeburg justice", "Magdeburg mercy" and "Magdeburg quarter" also arose as a result of the sack, used originally by Protestants when executing Roman Catholics who begged for quarter.

The massacre was forcefully described by Friedrich Schiller in his 1792 work History of the Thirty Years' War and perpetuated in a poem by Goethe. A scene of Brecht's play Mother Courage and Her Children, written in 1939, also refers to the event.

Political consequences

Administrator Christian William of Brandenburg was badly injured and taken prisoner. He later converted to Catholicism and was released. He received an annual sum of 12,000 thaler from the revenues of the archbishopric of Magdeburg under the Peace of Prague.

After the sack, the archbishopric of Magdeburg went to Archduke Leopold Wilhelm of Austria, youngest son of emperor Ferdinand II, as the new Catholic Administrator. The Peace of Prague (1635) confirmed his rule over the city, but three years later, Swedish troops expelled the Habsburg army and restored Augustus of Wettin (first elected in 1628) as Administrator as of October 1638. Augustus finally took full control of Magdeburg in December 1642 after a neutrality treaty was concluded with the Swedish general Lennart Torstenson. He was then able to begin the reconstruction of the city.

The Archbishopric of Magdeburg was secularized and ultimately fell to Brandenburg-Prussia upon Augustus' death in 1680.

Notes

References

Sources

Further reading

External links 
  Sack of Magdeburg  on Filbrun
 Count of Tilly on History of War

1631 in the Holy Roman Empire
Magdeburg
Magdeburg 1631
Magdeburg 1631
History of Magdeburg
Massacres in Germany
Magdeburg
Magdeburg
Magdeburg, Sack of
Catholic League (German)
Crimes against humanity